No Reason may refer to:

Film and television
 "No Reason" (House), an episode of the television series House
 No Reason, a 2010 German horror film directed by Olaf Ittenbach

Music
 "No Reason" (Grinspoon song), 2002
 "No Reason" (No Money Enterprise song), 2020
 "No Reason", a song from the 2018 stage musical Beetlejuice
 "No Reason", a song by Big Thief from their 2022 album Dragon New Warm Mountain I Believe in You
 "No Reason", a song by the Spencer Davis Group from their 1974 album Living in a Back Street
 "No Reason", a song by Sum 41 from their 2004 album Chuck

See also
 Reason (disambiguation)